Introducing Brad Mehldau is an album by pianist and composer Brad Mehldau, released on the Warner Bros. label in 1995.

Reception

AllMusic awarded the album 4 stars and in its review by Scott Yanow, called it "a fine start to what should be a productive career".

Track listing 
All compositions by Brad Mehldau except as indicated
 "It Might as Well Be Spring" (Oscar Hammerstein II, Richard Rodgers) - 7:46  
 "Countdown" (John Coltrane) - 4:12  
 "My Romance" (Rodgers, Lorenz Hart) - 6:23  
 "Angst" - 6:11  
 "Young Werther" - 7:11  
 "Prelude to a Kiss" (Duke Ellington) - 10:00  
 "London Blues" - 7:00  
 "From This Moment On" (Cole Porter) - 6:33  
 "Say Goodbye" - 9:25

Personnel 
Band
Brad Mehldau - piano
Larry Grenadier (tracks 1-5), Christian McBride (tracks 6-9) - bass
Jorge Rossy (tracks 1-5), Brian Blade (tracks 6-9) - drums

Production
Produced by Matt Pierson
Engineered by James Farber
Mastering by Greg Calbi 
Design by Rey International
Art Direction by Greg Ross 
Production Coordination by Dana Watson

References 

 

1995 albums
Brad Mehldau albums
Warner Records albums